Little Episodes is Ian McNabb's ninth solo album, only available through his official website. The album produced no singles, although a music video was released for the lead track 'Ancient Energy'.

Track listing
 "Ancient Energy" [6:00]
 "Only Children" [3:35]
 "High On a Hill" [4:08]
 "He Wrote Himself a Letter" [3:15]
 "Abigail Rain" [3:10]
 "Tiny Arrows" [3:25]
 "Little Episodes" [2:34]
 "Irresistible Ruins" [1:07]
 "A Heart That You Can Borrow" [3:16]
 "To Love and To Let Go" [2:39]
 "King of Hearts" [4:58]
 "Little Episodes" (reprise) [3:10]

References

2012 albums
Ian McNabb albums